is a free-to-play action role-playing video game developed and published by Gremory Games on mobile, and later ported to Windows PCs by Lilith and Infini-Brain. The game is a spin-off of Lilith's Taimanin visual novel series.

Story

Action Taimanin takes place in an alternate near future Japan. Demons have crossed over from the dark side, breaking the unspoken rules of non-interference. The rule is now obsolete, and a war rages between the humans and demons. As the fight rages on, crime syndicates are taking advantage of the chaos to rise in power. The government established an organization of ninja called "Taimanins" to fight the demons.

The main quest's storyline was finished with chapter 16, part 2.

Gameplay
Action Taimanin features multiple game modes. The main quest begins with retrieving a stolen bio-weapon from a UFS base. Time Attack mode has players racing against the clock and other players to try and rank as high as possible. Special Mode is a vehicle race to avoid obstacles and get to the finish line.

By completing different modes and training, players can unlock additional outfits for their favorite characters. Support characters are also on hand to help out with various skills. Bonding with the support characters will, unlock special slice-of-life events.

Characters
The following is a list of playable characters and does not cover the game's Supporters. Since the opening of the global server, the game adds a new playable character every 2 months.

Development
Action Taimanin was announced at TGS 2019 as an general audience aimed 3D game set in the Taimanin universe. The starting playable characters unveiled were Igawa Asagi, Igawa Sakura, and Mizuki Yukikaze.

Release
Shortly after the Japanese release, users noticed a remixed version of Au5's "Snowblind" was used in-game but the artist wasn't featured in the game's credits. Gremory Games would then issue an apology for copyright infringement and take measures to avoid similar situations in the future.

In September 2020, it was announced that Action Taimanin would be released globally for PC on Steam, as well as on iOS and Android devices. On May 4, 2021, the Japanese and global server merged with the former folding into the latter. The Japanese server final closure took place on July 27, with urging of Lilith and Gremory for Japanese players to register for a transfer.

The global server celebrated its first anniversary with several in-game events lasting for all of October 2021 with a second anniversary event taking place October 2022. Reception to the second anniversary was negative due to Gremory Games introducing the first paid-only character (Annerose from Koutetsu no Majo Annerose) without prior notice after she won the game's 2022 character popularity poll.

Reception
Sequential Planet complimented the game's visuals and performance as well as it being F2P-friendly. However, they criticized the stamina system, combat, and enemy variety. Iyane Agossah from DualShockers included Action Taimanin in his top 10 games of 2020, praising the game's story and calling it "surprisingly good and researched". However, he criticized the aggressive monetization and repetitive gameplay. GameRant called Action Taimanin one of the best free anime games on Steam.

See also
Honkai Impact 3rd
Punishing: Gray Raven

Notes

References

External links

Gremory Games official website

2019 video games
Action role-playing video games
Android (operating system) games
Dystopian video games
Free-to-play video games
Hack and slash games
Gacha games
IOS games
Mobile games
Video games about ninja
Video games containing battle passes
Video games developed in South Korea
Video games featuring female protagonists
Video games set in Japan
Video games set in the future
Windows games
Alternate history video games
Science fantasy video games